Michael Kantakouzenos or Cantacuzenus can refer to:

 Michael Kantakouzenos (died 1264), Byzantine general
 Michael Kantakouzenos (died 1316), Byzantine governor in the Morea, father of John VI Kantakouzenos
 Michael Kantakouzenos Şeytanoğlu (died 1578), Phanariote Greek magnate, founder of the modern branch of the Kantakouzenos family